The 2019 Sistan and Baluchestan protests were a series of protests in the Sistan and Baluchestan province of Iran. The protests started on 29 November 2019 after a prominent anti–government cleric was arrested.

Timeline
Protests started on 29 November in the Pashamagh and Sarbaz area after a prominent cleric was arrested. Demonstrators closed off several roads in the area, and were met with the security forces responding with tear gas and live bullets in attempt to disperse the crowd. At least six protesters were injured as a result.

References

Protests in Iran
2019 in Iran
2019 protests
History of Sistan and Baluchestan Province